The Great Seal of the State of Tennessee is the official insignia of the U.S. state of Tennessee.

Origins
An official Great Seal of Tennessee is provided for in the Constitution of the State of Tennessee of February 6, 1796.  However, design was not undertaken until September 25, 1801. Wheat and cotton were, and still are, important cash crops grown in the state.

Symbolism

The Roman numerals XVI, representing Tennessee as the 16th state to enter the United States, are found at the top of the seal.

Images of a plow, a bundle of wheat, a cotton plant, and the word "Agriculture" below the three images occupying the center of the seal. Wheat and cotton were, and still are, important cash crops grown in the state.

The lower half of the seal originally displayed a boat and a boatman with the word "Commerce" underneath, but was changed to a flat-bottomed riverboat without a boatman subsequently. River trade was important to the state due to three large rivers: the Tennessee River, the Cumberland River, and the Mississippi River; the boat continues to represent the importance of commerce to the state.

Surrounding the images in the original design were the words "The Great Seal of the State of Tennessee" and "Feb. 6th, 1796". The month and day have been dropped in the modern design.

Modern use
In 1987, the Tennessee General Assembly adopted a standardized version of the seal that updated its look and appearance.  The seal is kept by the Secretary of State and the Governor for official use on state documents, such as legislation, commissions, and proclamations.

The National Football League's Tennessee Titans have primary and secondary logos based on the seal.

See also

 Flag of Tennessee
 List of Tennessee state symbols

References

Tennessee culture
Tennessee
Tennessee
Tennessee
Tennessee
Tennessee
Tennessee